Lufwanyama is a constituency of the National Assembly of Zambia. It covers a large rural area in the Lufwanyama District of Copperbelt Province, including the town of Lufwanyama.

List of MPs

References

Constituencies of the National Assembly of Zambia
Constituencies established in 1991
1991 establishments in Zambia